The Men's pentathlon 3 was one of the events held in Athletics at the 1972 Summer Paralympics in Heidelberg.

There were 10 competitors in the event.

David Williamson of the United States won the gold medal.

Results

Final

References 

Pentathlon